William Thomas Napier Champ (15 April 1808 – 25 August 1892) was a soldier and politician who served as the first Premier of Tasmania from 1856 to 1857. He was born in the United Kingdom.

Early life
Champ was born in Maldon, Essex, England the son of Captain Thomas Champ and his wife Mary Anne née Blackaller. Champ was educated at the Royal Military College, Sandhurst. He joined the army as an ensign when 18 years old and later became an adjutant.

Army and police career
Champ was serving with the 63rd Regiment of Foot as an ensign by 1826 and was posted with them to Sydney, New South Wales in October 1828. Some of the regiment was detached as a garrison force for the Macquarie Harbour Penal Station, Van Diemens Land (now Tasmania) in 1829, and Champ was amongst them.

As a lieutenant with the 63rd, he took part in the Black War campaign which was an attempt to segregate Tasmanian Aborigines near the end of 1830.

The 63rd left New South Wales and Van Diemens Land in 1834 to deploy to India and Burma and Champ left with the regiment. However, he had apparently enjoyed his time in Australia and later in 1834 he resigned his army commission and returned to Van Diemens Land to enter the civil service. Champ then became an assistant police magistrate, before being appointed as the commandant of Port Arthur penitentiary (succeeding Charles O'Hara Booth) in 1844.

Political career
In 1852 Champ became a colonial secretary to Governor Denison.
In the 1850s, the British parliament passed legislation that would give Tasmania a responsible 'independent' government. This created the Tasmanian House of Assembly. The first elections for the House of Assembly took place in 1856. Prior to this Champ was a member of the Tasmanian Legislative Council chosen by the Governor from 1852 until 1856. He was elected as the member for Launceston in the new House of Assembly and became first Premier of the responsible government on 1 November 1856.

Champ held office of premier for 117 days, until 26 February 1857. Shortly into his term, his ministry collapsed and he was unable to govern. He was briefly opposition leader in 1857 but resigned shortly after.

He left Tasmania and became inspector-general of penal establishments in Victoria. He later entered politics in Victoria, becoming a member of the Victorian Legislative Assembly for East Bourke Boroughs from April 1871 until May 1873. 
He died in Melbourne, Victoria on 25 August 1892.

References

Other references listed by the Dictionary of Australian Biography:
The Argus, Melbourne, 27 August 1892
P. Mennell, The Dictionary of Australasian Biography
J. Fenton, A History of Tasmania, pp. 287–92
J. W. Beattie, Port Arthur.
 

|-

1808 births
1892 deaths
People from Maldon, Essex
Premiers of Tasmania
Members of the Tasmanian House of Assembly
Members of the Tasmanian Legislative Council
Members of the Victorian Legislative Assembly
Colonial Secretaries of Tasmania
63rd Regiment of Foot officers
Graduates of the Royal Military College, Sandhurst
Leaders of the Opposition in Tasmania
19th-century Australian politicians
19th-century Australian public servants
English emigrants to colonial Australia